The women's 50 metre freestyle event at the 2016 Summer Olympics took place between 12–13 August at the Olympic Aquatics Stadium.

Summary
Pernille Blume defeated the field of experienced sprinters to give Denmark its first Olympic swimming title in 68 years. Leading the program's shortest race from prelims into the semifinals, she splashed her way to a gold-medal triumph in 24.07, but fell short of her attempt to overhaul Ranomi Kromowidjojo's Olympic record by a small fraction of a second. U.S. sprinter Simone Manuel, newly crowned Olympic champion of the 100 m freestyle, settled for the silver in 24.09, stopping 0.02 seconds behind Blume. Meanwhile, London 2012 runner-up Aliaksandra Herasimenia of Belarus secured the top three spot with a 24.11 for the bronze.

Great Britain's Francesca Halsall narrowly missed out of the medals by 0.02 of a second, finishing with a fourth-place time in 24.13. Unable to bounce back from their out-of-medal feat in the 100 m freestyle, sisters and pre-race favorites Cate (24.15) and Bronte Campbell (24.42) slipped to fifth and seventh, respectively, while defending champion Kromowidjojo of the Netherlands split the Australian duo to take the sixth spot in 24.19. Brazil's hometown favorite Etiene Medeiros wrapped up the top eight with a 24.69.

Notable swimmers failed to reach the top eight final, including Blume's fellow sprinter Jeanette Ottesen, London 2012 finalist Arianna Vanderpool-Wallace of the Bahamas, and Swedish tandem of three-time medalist Sarah Sjöström and Therese Alshammar, who built a historic milestone as the first ever female in the pool to compete at her sixth Olympics.

Records
Prior to this competition, the existing world and Olympic records were as follows.

Competition format

The competition consisted of three rounds: heats, semifinals, and a final. The swimmers with the best 16 times in the heats advanced to the semifinals. The swimmers with the best 8 times in the semifinals advanced to the final. Swim-offs were used as necessary to break ties for advancement to the next round.

Results

Heats

Semifinals

Semifinal 1

Semifinal 2

Final

References

Women's 00050 metre freestyle
Olympics
2016 in women's swimming
Women's events at the 2016 Summer Olympics